The 2016 Mubadala World Tennis Championship was a non-ATP affiliated exhibition tournament. It was the 8th edition of the Mubadala World Tennis Championship with the world's top players competing in the event, which was held in a knockout format. The winner received a purse of $250,000. The event was held at the Abu Dhabi International Tennis Complex at the Zayed Sports City in Abu Dhabi, United Arab Emirates.

Champion

 Rafael Nadal def.  Milos Raonic by 7–6(7–2), 6–3

Players

References

External links
Official website

World Tennis Championship
2016 in Emirati tennis
World Tennis Championship